Abitbol is a Maghrebi Jewish surname common Morocco, France and Israel. Notable people with the surname include:

 Michel Abitbol (born 1943), Israeli historian
 Sarah Abitbol (born 1975), French pair skater
 Sylvain Abitbol, Canadian engineer
 William Abitbol (1949-2016), French politician
 Pascale Abitbol (born 1982), Canadian ex-porn actress and HIV activist

See also
 Jewish name, paragraph about Oriental Jewish names
Other variations of the name:
 Abiteboul
 Abutbul
 Botbol, with a comprehensive etymology

References 

Maghrebi Jewish surnames
Arabic-language surnames
Surnames of Moroccan origin